Theroa zethus is a species of moth in the family Notodontidae (the prominents). It was first described by Druce in 1898 and it is found in North America.

The MONA or Hodges number for Theroa zethus is 8000.

References

Further reading

External links

 

Notodontidae
Articles created by Qbugbot
Moths described in 1898